Andrei Kolesnikov or Andrey Kolesnikov may refer to:

 Andrei Kolesnikov (footballer) (born 1984), Russian footballer
 Andrei Kolesnikov (ice hockey) (born 1989), Russian professional ice hockey defenceman 
 Andrey Vladimirovich Kolesnikov (born 1966), Russian journalist
 Andrei Kolesnikov (general) (1977–2022), Russian general